Marangos ) is a Greek surname. Notable people with the surname include:

Christos Marangos (born 1983), Cypriot footballer
Ioannis Marangos (1833–1891), Greek Roman Catholic archbishop
Spiros Marangos (born 1967), Greek footballer
Stelios Marangos (born 1989), Greek footballer
Thodoros Marangos (born 1944), Greek film director

Greek-language surnames
Surnames